Ugonna Umerou is a Nigerian designer and actress. She owns the House of Nwaocha feminine clothing line.

References

Year of birth missing (living people)
Living people
Nigerian film actresses
Igbo actresses
Nigerian women in business
Nigerian fashion businesspeople
Nigerian fashion designers
21st-century Nigerian actresses